Classy may mean:
 Possessing elegance, the attribute of being tastefully designed, decorated, and maintaining refined grace and dignified propriety
 Classy (company), an American crowdfunding company
 Classy (group), a South Korean girl group
 The acoustic version of "Baby Got Back" from the American television show "Glee"
 Classy (magazine), a Japanese women's magazine
 The nickname of professional wrestler Fred Blassie